Polykarpos "Karpos" Papadopoulos (Greek: Πολύκαρπος (Κάρπος) Παπαδόπουλος) was a Greek merchant, writer and revolutionary. He was born possibly in the 1790s in Edirne or in Enez in East Thrace, where in 1818 he was initiated Filiki Eteria. He was educated and after the revolution he wrote books about several fighters. He died in 1871, having been granted the rank of chiliarch.

During the Revolution of 1821 
At the start of the revolution he left Odessa and went to Central Greece to fight on the side of Odysseas Androutsos, the latter giving him the title of chiliarch, but shortly after asking him to fight as a simple soldier. In 1825, after the death of Androutsos, he fought alone against Ibrahim and participated in the Battle of the Lerna Mills. He served for some time in the army of Demetrios Ypsilantis, but in the last years of the revolution fought in the army of Charles Nicolas Fabvier.

Greek military personnel
Greek writers
1790 births
1871 deaths
People from Edirne Province